ETFELA (N-ethyl-N-(2,2,2-trifluoroethyl)lysergamide) is an analog of lysergic acid diethylamide (LSD) first synthesised by Jason C. Parrish as part of the research team led by David E. Nichols. In studies in vitro, it was found to be slightly more potent than LSD itself.

See also 
 ECPLA
 Methylisopropyllysergamide

References 

Lysergamides